HMS Una was a British U-class submarine, of the second group of that class, built at Chatham Dockyard. She was laid down on 7 May 1940 and was commissioned on 27 September 1941.

Career 

She spent most of her career operating in the Mediterranean from early 1942, where she sank the Italian tanker Luciana, the Italian fishing vessel Maria Immacolata, and the Italian merchants  and Petrarca. Controversially, the Lucania was a tanker which had been granted immunity by the Admiralty, as she was to serve as a replenishment ship for an Italian ship repatriating civilians from East Africa; the submarine's commander, Lieutenant D.S.R. Martin, was ill and had not read the Admiralty signal before departure.  She also damaged two sailing vessels and the Italian merchant Cosala (the former Yugoslavian Serafin Topic). The damaged Italian ship was grounded, but declared a total loss and eventually sank during a storm.

She was unlucky on numerous occasions, unsuccessfully attacking the Italian merchant Brioni, the Italian tanker Panuco and the German merchant Menes.  Una also fired torpedoes against a merchant in Lampedusa harbour. The torpedoes however hit the rocks.

In the night of 11/12 August 1942 disembarked a commando group on the shores of Catania, Sicily. The idea was to attack an airfield in support of operation Pedestal, but after blowing up the electrical power lines between Syracuse and Catania, the dispirited group was taken prisoner.

From April to August 1943, she was used for Anti-Submarine training after undergoing a refit in the UK. After the end of the war, she was decommissioned and placed in reserve in November 1945. She was sold to be broken up for scrap on 11 April 1949 and scrapped at Llanelly.

References 

 
 
 

 

British U-class submarines
Ships built in Chatham
1941 ships
World War II submarines of the United Kingdom